The Molly Wopsies was a UK children's comedy drama by Thames Television which, following a pilot in 1974, ran for 13 episodes in 1976. The story was about a group of children, including by two evacuees, in a wartime Oxfordshire village, and their adventures, often involving run-ins with the village policeman.

Cast
Alan Musgrove, Phil Daniels
Dinkey Dunkley, Ben Forster 
PC Berry, played by Aubrey Morris
Dottie Minton, Julie Taylor

References

1976 British television series debuts
1976 British television series endings
1970s British children's television series